The Gatton Academy (Carol Martin Gatton Academy of Mathematics and Science in Kentucky) is a public academy and an early college entrance program funded by the state of Kentucky and located on the campus of Western Kentucky University in Bowling Green, KY, United States.

In 2010 and 2011 the Gatton Academy ranked on [[Newsweek|Newsweek'''s]] Public Elite list, a list of the nation's 20 top public high schools, as graded by scores on standardized tests. The Gatton Academy was recognized by Newsweek magazine as one of the nation's top five high schools. America's Best High Schools 2011 recognized more than 500 schools from across the United States. In June 2012 the Gatton Academy was recognized as Newsweek's Top School in America. For three years in a row, the Gatton Academy was ranked the best in the nation by The Daily Beast''.

Overview
The Gatton Academy began in the 2007–2008 school year.

As of the 2021–2022 school year, the Academy admits 95 qualifying high school students (for a total of 190 students attending) each year to spend their junior and senior years on the WKU campus taking classes at the university. The students are selected on basis of grades, standardized test scores, extracurricular activities, teacher and community leader recommendations, personal interview, and interest in a science, mathematical, or engineering career, and focus their classes mainly on mathematics and sciences.

Students of the Academy are considered both undergraduates and high school students by Kentucky and federal scholarship programs. As such, they are qualified for undergraduate research programs, scholarships, honors, and even (in exceptional cases) bachelor's degrees, but at the same time must take the classes required by the state of Kentucky for a high school diploma (and, if still enrolled in their home high school, the classes required by their previous school). Students also have the option of being dually-enrolled, or, remaining students at their home high schools while attending the Academy. However, some private schools will not allow students to remain enrolled while attending the Academy. This dual-enrollment option allows students, in some cases, to remain eligible for services offered by their home high school (guidance, textbook funding). However, this option also requires students to meet state graduation requirements, and participate in KPREP testing. The home schools benefit from this arrangement by receiving the test scores from their respective Gatton scholars.

Most of the school's graduates attend four-year colleges (67% of graduates attend either Western Kentucky University, the University of Kentucky or the University of Louisville), while some chose to pursue other opportunities during gap years.

See also
 Alabama School of Mathematics and Science
 Arkansas School for Mathematics, Sciences, and the Arts
 Craft Academy for Excellence in Science and Mathematics
 Illinois Mathematics and Science Academy
 Indiana Academy for Science, Mathematics, and Humanities
 Kansas Academy of Mathematics and Science
 Louisiana School for Math, Science, and the Arts
 Maine School of Science and Mathematics 
 Mississippi School for Mathematics and Science
 North Carolina School of Science and Mathematics
 Oklahoma School of Science and Mathematics
 South Carolina Governor's School for Science and Mathematics
 Texas Academy of Mathematics and Science

References

External links

Educational institutions established in 2007
University-affiliated schools in the United States
NCSSS schools
Western Kentucky University
Schools in Warren County, Kentucky
Public high schools in Kentucky
Boarding schools in Kentucky
Public boarding schools in the United States
2007 establishments in Kentucky